The 2016–17 Real Sociedad season was the club's 70th season in La Liga. This article shows player statistics and all matches (official and friendly) the club played during the 2016–17 season.

Current squad

Out on loan

In

Out

Pre-season and friendlies

Competitions

Overall

La Liga

League table

Results summary

source:

Result round by round

Matches

Copa del Rey

Round of 32

Round of 16

Quarter-finals

Statistics

Appearances and goals
Last updated on 21 May 2017.

|-
! colspan=14 style=background:#dcdcdc; text-align:center|Goalkeepers

|-
! colspan=14 style=background:#dcdcdc; text-align:center|Defenders

|-
! colspan=14 style=background:#dcdcdc; text-align:center|Midfielders

|-
! colspan=14 style=background:#dcdcdc; text-align:center|Forwards

|-
! colspan=14 style=background:#dcdcdc; text-align:center| Players who have made an appearance or had a squad number this season but have left the club

|-
|}

References

External links
Club's official website

Real Sociedad
Real Sociedad seasons